Budhuwala  is a village in Kapurthala district of Punjab State, India. The village is administrated by a Sarpanch who is an elected representative of village as per the constitution of India and Panchayati raj (India).

Demography 
According to the report published by Census India in 2011, Budhuwala has a total number of 32 houses and population of 207 of which include 101 males and 106 females. Literacy rate of Budhuwala is 82.35%, higher than state average of 75.84%.  The population of children under the age of 6 years is 20 which is 9.66% of total population of Budhuwala, and child sex ratio is approximately  1000, higher than state average of 846.

Population data

Air travel connectivity 
The closest airport to the village is Sri Guru Ram Dass Jee International Airport.

Villages in Kapurthala

External links
  Villages in Kapurthala
 Kapurthala Villages List

References

Villages in Kapurthala district